Diamond Jenness Secondary School is a high school in Hay River, Northwest Territories, Canada. The school is overseen by the Hay River District Education Authority, and administered as part of the South Slave Divisional Education Council.

Background
In 2009 the school had about 330 students and 29 staff members, Heather Pedjase was the principal. According to the Divisional Education Council, the school has the largest percentage of students in the Schools North Apprenticeship Program and "...maintains high academic standards and expectations for student attendance and achievement."

The school is undergoing renovations and retrofitting that will include the establishment of a new trades centre.

The school's purple colour was chosen by the students in a vote by the first graduating class. It is located in the South Slave Region and is a part of the South Slave Divisional Education Council, alongside other schools in the communities of Fort Smith, Fort Resolution, Lutselk'e, and Kátlodéhche First Nation (Hay River Reserve).

History
The school, opened in 1972, replaced the old Federal School that had been located on Vale Island. It was designed by Calgary-born Métis/Blackfoot architect, Douglas Cardinal, who also designed the Canadian Museum of Civilization and the original Edmonton Space Science Centre.

The school was named in honour of New Zealand born anthropologist, Diamond Jenness, who along with Vilhjalmur Stefansson, spent several years in the Arctic region of the NWT, especially the Coronation Gulf area studying the Copper Inuit.

Asbestos
In February 2008 a substance thought to be asbestos was found below a heating pipe. The school was closed for several days while the material, air samples and some of the insulation were tested. According to a follow-up report by CBC North, the pipe insulation, the air samples and the material did not contain asbestos.

Despite these findings, a report by Northern News Services stated that during the following spring break a work crew had replaced all 300 pipe elbows in the school because officials believed the insulating wrap may have contained asbestos.

References

High schools in the Northwest Territories